The Mosely snowflake (after Jeannine Mosely) is a Sierpiński–Menger type of fractal obtained in two variants either by the operation opposite to creating the Sierpiński-Menger snowflake or Cantor dust i.e. not by leaving but by removing eight of the smaller 1/3-scaled corner cubes and the central one from each cube left from the previous recursion (lighter) or by removing only corner cubes (heavier). 
In one dimension this operation (i.e. the recursive removal of two side line segments) is trivial and converges only to single point.
It resembles the original water snowflake of snow. By the construction the Hausdorff dimension of the lighter snowflake is 

and the heavier 

.

See also
 Menger sponge

References

 .

Fractals
Curves
Topological spaces
Cubes